Mercedes Román Casillas (born 26 September 1945) is a retired Mexican athlete who competed in the pentathlon as well as a number of individual events. She competed in the women's 4 × 100 metres relay, long jump and pentathlon at the 1968 Summer Olympics. Román finished fourth in the 100 metres hurdles and sixth in the pentathlon at the 1971 Pan American Games.

References

External links
 

1945 births
Living people
Athletes (track and field) at the 1968 Summer Olympics
Mexican female sprinters
Mexican female long jumpers
Mexican pentathletes
Olympic athletes of Mexico
Athletes (track and field) at the 1967 Pan American Games
Athletes (track and field) at the 1971 Pan American Games
Athletes (track and field) at the 1975 Pan American Games
Pan American Games competitors for Mexico
Competitors at the 1970 Central American and Caribbean Games
Competitors at the 1974 Central American and Caribbean Games
Central American and Caribbean Games silver medalists for Mexico
Central American and Caribbean Games bronze medalists for Mexico
Athletes from Mexico City
Central American and Caribbean Games medalists in athletics